Mosjøen is a town in Vefsn Municipality in Nordland county, Norway. Mosjøen is the oldest town in the Helgeland region, with only the town of Bodø being older within Nordland county. The town is also the administrative centre of Vefsn Municipality. The old village of Mosjøen was declared a ladested in 1875. It was also a town municipality from 1875 until 1961 when it was merged into Vefsn, losing its status as a town (ladested). It is also a former garrison town and customs place. In 1998, the urban area of Mosjøen was declared to be a town once again. People from Mosjøen are referred to using the demonym "".

Together with the other regional towns of Mo i Rana and Narvik, Mosjøen is one of the industrial towns in Nordland county. Owned by Alcoa, Mosjøen Aluminum Plant is among the biggest in Europe, and is traditionally the town's cornerstone. Additionally, the town's business sector includes trade, crafts, banking, transportation, and tourism. The town attracts customers from the entire region.

Mosjøen is a transport hub in Helgeland. The European route E6 highway runs through the town. There are daily departures from Mosjøen Bus Central, from Mosjøen Railway Station on the Nordland Line, and from Mosjøen Airport south of the town. There are both public and private quays in Mosjøen. The town's harbour is among the largest in Northern Norway.

In the aspect of secondary and adult education, Mosjøen exercises both local and regional functions. Offering general (including music), vocational, and agricultural lines, Mosjøen High School also receives students from rural municipalities surrounding the town and from other regions of Nordland. Vefsn Folk High School lies in Mosjøen, while Sandvik Folk High School is located north of it. The town has got a department of the Open University. Many bigger events for children and youths take place in Mosjøen, among others Toppen International Summer Music School and The Kippermoen Cup.

Mosjøen is known for Sjøgata: Northern Norway's longest cluster of 19th-century wooden houses and piers. Other tourist attractions include Dolstad Church from 1735, the award-winning Town Park from 1905, and the aluminum plant.

Etymology 

The town is named after the old Mo farm the town was built up on the outskirts of the large farm. Mosjøen, therefor means "the sea(side) belonging to Mo". In other words, it was a place where the farmers of Mo had their boats and boatsheds. Earlier spellings are Moesøen in the 18th century and Mosøen in the 19th century.

History 

Mentioned in Aslak Bolt's cadastre of the 15th century, Mo is a medieval farm with a history at least dating to the Viking Age. Mosjøen's own history starts in the early modern period. Mosjøen was populated by 1600. The earliest inhabitant known by name is Svein Beachdweller, who lived there together with his wife and daughters in 1660. In the 17th and early 18th century, especially following the 1645 Treaty of Brömsebro, several inhabitants of Jemtland escaped to Trøndelag and to Nordland. Many of them came to Vefsn, including Mosjøen. In the 18th century, Mosjøen as a settlement for nonagrarian occupations started to materialise. For example, the regional executioner resided there temporarily. As did a handful of craftsmen and public officials.

From the late 16th century until the 1820s, Mo was possessed by the Mo family: wealthy farmers as well as skippers and merchants who contributed to Mosjøen's gradual expansion. In 1794, a member of the family received royal privilege to establish a trading post in Mosjøen.

In the 1860s, a group of Englishmen—the 'salmon lords'—established The North of Europe Land & Mining Company, introducing the first industrial period in Mosjøen. Sawmill industry created 'Klondike conditions': People came from everywhere in order to get a job, to trade, and so on, and salaries were relatively high.

On 4 April 1874, King Oscar II decided to grant ladested (town) status to Mosjøen effective on 1 January 1875. As a new town, it had the right to self-government, so it was separated from Vefsn Municipality to become a separate municipality on 1 January 1876. Initially, the new town had 379 residents. In 1939, a small adjoining area of Vefsn was transferred into the town of Mosjøen. The Cinema Museum in London holds excellent film of the area in 1931 in its collection (ref HMO321) 

As the biggest and most important, central town in the Helgeland region, Mosjøen became northern headquarters of the Nazi German occupiers between 1940 and 1945.  After the war in 1945, Mosjøen entered its second industrial period. Among several industrial establishments was Mosjøen Aluminum Plant.

Mosjøen's coat of arms was granted by King Olav V on 25 March 1960. Composed by sculptor Arthur Gustavsson, it is blazoned Sable, a cock Argent. The cock is traditionally equipped with red beak, wattles, comb, and claws: the so-called colour of armament. The cock represents watchfulness and fighting spirit. After the merger with Vefsn in 1962, the coat of arms has been used by Vefsn Municipality.

During the 1960s, there were many municipal mergers across Norway due to the work of the Schei Committee. On 1 January 1962, a major municipal merger took place.  The town of Mosjøen (population: 4,628) was merged with the municipalities of Vefsn (population: 5,358), Drevja (population: 1,001), and Elsfjord (population: 920), creating a new municipality called Vefsn.  Upon merging, Mosjøen lost its status as a town.
 
In 1998, the municipal council of Vefsn declared Mosjøen to have the formal status as a town.

Municipal self-government (1875-1962)
Mosjøen was a self-governing municipality from 1875 until 1962. During that time, this municipality was responsible for primary education (through 10th grade), outpatient health services, senior citizen services, unemployment, social services, zoning, economic development, and municipal roads. During its existence, this municipality was governed by a municipal council of elected representatives, which in turn elected a mayor.

Municipal council
The municipal council  of Mosjøen was made up of representatives that were elected to four year terms.  The party breakdown of the final municipal council was as follows:

Mayors
The mayors of Mosjøen:

 1876-1877: Andreas Christian Bech Jürgensen
 1878-1879: Johan Jakob Johannessen
 1880-1882: Andreas Christian Bech Jürgensen 
 1883-1887: Ole Sivert Elnan (V)
 1888-1889: Andreas Fredrik Peter Schroeter
 1890-1890: Ole Sivert Elnan (V)
 1891-1891: Andreas Fredrik Peter Schroeter 
 1891-1891: Ole Sivert Elnan (V)
 1892-1895: Christian Fredrik Nergaard Havig (V)
 1896-1898: Ole Sivert Elnan (V)
 1899-1901: Erik Bathen (H)
 1902-1903: Ole Sivert Elnan (V)
 1904-1908: Erik Bathen (H)
 1909-1909: Ole Andreas Fellingfors (H)
 1910-1910: Erik Bathen (H)
 1910-1910: Ole Andreas Fellingfors (H)
 1911-1913: Mathias Løkke
 1914-1916: Thomas Riis
 1917-1917: Anton Solbraa 
 1918-1921: Kristian Tustervatn (V)
 1922-1923: Ole Tobias Olsen 
 1924-1924: Otto Bugge (Ap)
 1925-1925: Ole Tobias Olsen 
 1926-1926: Kristian Tustervatn (V)
 1927-1931: Harald Robert Barth (LL)
 1932-1934: Hans Olaus Jarnæs (LL)
 1935-1935: Harald Robert Barth (LL)
 1936-1937: Hans Olaus Jarnæs (LL)
 1938-1941: Carl Wilhelm Johansen (Ap)
 1941-1942: Carl August Eliassen (NS)
 1943-1945: Halfdan Sundlo (NS)
 1945-1945: Carl Wilhelm Johansen (Ap)
 1945-1945: Kristian Karlsen (Ap)
 1946-1947: Johan Kristian Lian (Ap)
 1948-1949: Ole Ferdinand Andersen (Ap)
 1950-1951: Ole Jakob Wika (Ap)
 1952-1957: Ole Ferdinand Andersen (Ap) 
 1957-1962: Einar Jensen (Ap)

Industry and business 

Mosjøen is one of the industrial towns in Nordland. Especially important is the Mosjøen Aluminum Plant, owned by Alcoa.

Mosjøen's business sector contains both traditional and modern companies as well as a wide spectre of branches, including trade, crafts, banking, transportation, and tourism. The town is a commercial centre in the region, attracting customers from smaller neighbouring towns and from rural municipalities.

Transportation 

As a transport hub in Helgeland, Mosjøen connects to the towns of Sandnessjøen  to the west, Mo i Rana  to the north, and Brønnøysund  to the south by road. The European route E6 between Trondheim  to the south and the county capital Bodø  to the north runs through Mosjøen.

Mosjøen is also accessible by airplane, by train, and by ship. Mosjøen is served by Mosjøen Airport, Kjærstad, which is located five minutes by car south of the town. Mosjøen Station on the Nordland Line has daily departures for Trondheim in the south and for the Bodø in the north. A smaller commuter rail operates between Trofors and Mo i Rana.

Encompassing both private and public quays, Mosjøen's harbour is the biggest port in Northern Norway. Mosjøen Aluminum Plant has got its own port.

Tourism 

The following are popular sightseeing spots:

 Sjøgata, a historic and picturesque street containing the largest concentration of 19th-century wooden buildings in Northern Norway.
 Fru Haugans Hotel, established in 1794 and today the oldest hotel in Northern Norway.
 Dolstad Church, established in 1735.
 The Town Park, established ca. 1900 and regarded as one of the finest public parks in Norway.

Geography

Topography 
Mosjøen is situated in the lower part of the Vefsn Valley, where the Vefsna and Skjerva rivers flow into the Vefsnfjord. Downtown Mosjøen lies on a flat moorland between these two rivers. Moreover, the town is surrounded by mountains and hills, which are mainly vegetated.

Climate 
The town has mild summers and moderately cold winters, but is mild compared to other places on similar latitudes. Situated at the head of a relatively narrow fjord, Mosjøen is not as mild in winter as places on the outer seaboard, but has slightly warmer summers. Mosjøen receives a large amount of precipitation, particularly in autumn and early winter, and usually has substantial amounts of snow on the ground from early winter to April. Its temperatures are fairly similar to that of Anchorage, Alaska.The weather station is located at the airport, about 7 km further into the valley from Mosjøen. The town itself, located at the shores of the fjord, will have warmer lows than the airport. The record low is from January 2010. Mosjøen experiences midnight sun from June 16 to 26th due to atmospheric refraction, but has no polar night.

Friendship towns

References

External links

 Municipality of Vefsn
 mosjoen.com - local portal for Mosjøen and Vefsn
 Vefsn Slektshistorielag (Genealogy)

Vefsn
Populated places in Nordland
Cities and towns in Norway
Former municipalities of Norway
1875 establishments in Norway
1961 disestablishments in Norway
1998 establishments in Norway